Tennessee's 32nd Senate district is one of 33 districts in the Tennessee Senate. It has been represented by Republican Paul Rose since a 2019 special election to replace fellow Republican Mark Norris.

Geography
District 32 is based in the eastern and northern suburbs of Memphis in Shelby and Tipton Counties, covering parts of Memphis proper as well as Bartlett, Collierville, Lakeland, Arlington, Covington, Atoka, and Munford.

The district is located almost entirely within Tennessee's 8th congressional district, with a small section extending into the 9th district. It overlaps with the 81st, 83rd, 88th, 95th, 97th, 98th, and 99th districts of the Tennessee House of Representatives, and borders the states of Mississippi and Arkansas.

Recent election results
Tennessee Senators are elected to staggered four-year terms, with odd-numbered districts holding elections in midterm years and even-numbered districts holding elections in presidential years.

2020

2019 special
In 2018, incumbent Mark Norris was appointed as a United States District Judge for the Western District of Tennessee, triggering a special election to replace him in March 2019.

2016

2012

Federal and statewide results in District 32

References

32
Shelby County, Tennessee
Tipton County, Tennessee